Ashland Company Store is a historic company store building located at Ashland, McDowell County, West Virginia.  It was built in 1907, and is a two-story brick commercial building on a brick and stone foundation.  It has a low hipped roof.  In addition to the store, the building housed a warehouse, the paymaster's office, U.S. Post Office, and company offices.  The post office was in use until 1991.  Also on the property is a gym building (c. 1907).

It was listed on the National Register of Historic Places in 2005.

References

Commercial buildings on the National Register of Historic Places in West Virginia
Commercial buildings completed in 1907
Buildings designated early commercial in the National Register of Historic Places in West Virginia
Former post office buildings
Warehouses on the National Register of Historic Places
National Register of Historic Places in McDowell County, West Virginia
Company stores in the United States